Sergej Baziuk is a Lithuanian diver.

Achievements

References 
EC2008
EC2011

Living people
Lithuanian male divers
Year of birth missing (living people)